For information on all Brown University sports, see Brown Bears

The Brown Bears football program is the intercollegiate American football team for Brown University located in the U.S. state of Rhode Island. The team competes in the NCAA Division I Football Championship Subdivision (FCS) and are members of the Ivy League. Brown's first football team was fielded in 1878. The Bears play their home games at the 20,000-seat Richard Gouse Field at Brown Stadium in Providence, Rhode Island. The team's head coach is James Perry, who was hired on December 3, 2018.

History

In the middle of the 1926 season, the “Iron Men” came into being when the same 11 players played against Yale for 60 minutes and a 7–0 win. The next week the same 11 players played without substitution against Dartmouth and won 10–0. Two weeks later the Iron Men played 58 minutes against Harvard, but in the last two minutes the substitutes came in to earn their letters. Brown won all its games that year until the Thanksgiving game against Colgate ended in a 10–10 tie. The famed “Iron Men” were Thurston Towle ’28, Paul Hodge ’28, Orland Smith ’27, Charles Considine ’28, Lou Farber ’29, Ed Kevorkian ’29, Hal Broda ’27, Al Cornsweet ’29, Dave Mishel ’27, Ed Lawrence ’28, and Roy Randall ’28. In the 1948 season, Brown fans were the originators of the popular "de-fense!" chant that spread to the NFL in the 1950s. Following the 1981 season, the Ivy League was reclassified to Division I-AA, today known as the Football Championship Subdivision (FCS), Brown moved to Division I-AA play with the rest of the league. Brown has 607 wins, making them tied for 72nd all time in wins among division one football programs.

In 1997, Phil Estes began a twenty-one year tenure as Brown's head coach, resulting in three Ivy League championships. In 2018, after two consecutive winless seasons in the Ivy League, Estes announced that he would be stepping down.

Before the start of the 2020 season, the Ivy League announced that no sports would be played until January 1, 2021, at the earliest, because of the COVID-19 pandemic. It has not yet been determined whether the football season will take place in the spring 2021 or not at all.

Championships 
The Bears have no national championships, though they do have one undefeated team, the 1926 team, also known as the Iron Men of 1926, finishing 9–0–1 (and winning all three of their Ivy League games), with a 10–10 tie with Colgate in the last game of the season.

Conference championships
The Bears have won the Ivy League title four times in their history. The Bears won their first Ivy League title in 1976, sharing it with Yale while finishing 8–1 on the season, clinching the title with a 28–17 victory over Columbia. In 1999, the Bears went 9–1 (the most victories since 1926, along with a record seven game winning streak), while beating Columbia 23–6 to share the Ivy League title with Yale. In 2005, the Bears finished 9–1, beating Columbia 52–21 in their final game in order to clinch their first ever outright Ivy League title and third overall. In 2008, the Bears finished 7–3 (while losing only one Ivy League game), beating Columbia 41–10 to clinch a share of the Ivy League title, their fourth over conference title and third in nine years.

Bowl games
Brown has made one bowl appearance, garnering a record of 0–1.

Rivalries

Rhode Island

Brown leads the series with Rhode Island, their in-state rival, 73–27–2.

College Football Hall of Famers
 John Heisman (1887–1889, elected in 1954)
 Tuss McLaughry (1926–1940, elected in 1962)
 Fritz Pollard (1915–1916, elected in 1954)
 Eddie N. Robinson (played 1892–1895; coached 1904–1907, 1910–1925, elected in 1955)
 Earl Sprackling (1908-1911, elected 1964)
 Wallace Wade (1914–1916, elected in 1955)

Notable former players

 Zak DeOssie
 James Develin
 John Heisman
 Steve Jordan
 Bob Margarita
 Sean Morey
 Bill O'Brien
 Joe Paterno
 E. J. Perry
 Fritz Pollard
 Kyle Rowley

References

External links

 

 
American football teams established in 1878
1878 establishments in Rhode Island